Wiktionary (rhyming with "dictionary") is a multilingual, web-based project to create a free content dictionary of terms (including words, phrases, proverbs, linguistic reconstructions, etc.) in all natural languages and in a number of artificial languages. These entries may contain definitions, images for illustration, pronunciations, etymologies, inflections, usage examples, quotations, related terms, and translations of terms into other languages, among other features. It is collaboratively edited via a wiki. Its name is a portmanteau of the words wiki and dictionary. It is available in  languages and in Simple English. Like its sister project Wikipedia, Wiktionary is run by the Wikimedia Foundation, and is written collaboratively by volunteers, dubbed "Wiktionarians". Its wiki software, MediaWiki, allows almost anyone with access to the website to create and edit entries.

Because Wiktionary is not limited by print space considerations, most of Wiktionary's language editions provide definitions and translations of terms from many languages, and some editions offer additional information typically found in thesauri.

Wiktionary's data is frequently used in various natural language processing tasks.

History and development 
Wiktionary was brought online on December 12, 2002, following a proposal by Daniel Alston and an idea by Larry Sanger, co-founder of Wikipedia. On March 28, 2004, the first non-English Wiktionaries were initiated in French and Polish. Wiktionaries in numerous other languages have since been started. Wiktionary was hosted on a temporary domain name (wiktionary.wikipedia.org) until May 1, 2004, when it switched to the current domain name. , Wiktionary features over 30 million articles (and even more entries) across its editions. The largest of the language editions is the English Wiktionary, with over 7.3 million entries, followed by the French Wiktionary with over 4.6 million and the Malagasy Wiktionary with over 1.8 million entries. Forty-three Wiktionary language editions contain over 100,000 entries each.

Many of the definitions at the project's largest language editions were created by bots that found creative ways to generate entries or (rarely) automatically imported thousands of entries from previously published dictionaries. Seven of the 18 bots registered at the English Wiktionary in 2007 created 163,000 of the entries there.

Another of these bots, "ThirdPersBot," was responsible for the addition of a number of third-person conjugations that would not have received their own entries in standard dictionaries; for instance, it defined "smoulders" as the "third-person singular simple present form of smoulder." Of the 1,269,938 definitions the English Wiktionary provides for 996,450 English words, 478,068 are "form of" definitions of this kind. This means that even without such entries, its coverage of English is significantly larger than that of major monolingual print dictionaries. Merriam-Webster's Third New International Dictionary of the English Language, Unabridged, for instance, has 475,000 entries (with many additional embedded headwords); the Oxford English Dictionary has 615,000 headwords, but includes Middle English as well, for which the English Wiktionary has an additional 
34,234 gloss definitions. Detailed statistics exist to show how many entries of various kinds exist.

The English Wiktionary does not rely on bots to the extent that some other editions do. The French and Vietnamese Wiktionaries, for example, imported large sections of the Free Vietnamese Dictionary Project (FVDP), which provides free content bilingual dictionaries to and from Vietnamese. These imported entries make up virtually all of the Vietnamese edition's contents. Like the English edition, the French Wiktionary has imported approximately 20,000 entries from the Unihan database of Chinese, Japanese, Korean and Indian characters. The French Wiktionary grew rapidly in 2006 thanks in a large part to bots copying many entries from old, freely licensed dictionaries, such as the eighth edition of the Dictionnaire de l'Académie française (1935, around 35,000 words), and using bots to add words from other Wiktionary editions with French translations. The Russian edition grew by nearly 80,000 entries as "LXbot" added boilerplate entries (with headings, but without definitions) for words in English and German.

As of July 2021, the English Wiktionary has over 791,870 gloss definitions and over 1,269,938 total definitions (including different forms) for English entries alone, with a total of over 9,928,056 definitions across all languages.

Logos
Wiktionary has historically lacked a uniform logo across its numerous language editions. Some editions use logos that depict a dictionary entry about the term "Wiktionary", based on the previous English Wiktionary logo, which was designed by Brion Vibber, a MediaWiki developer. Because a purely textual logo must vary considerably from language to language, a four-phase contest to adopt a uniform logo was held at the Wikimedia Meta-Wiki from September to October 2006. Some communities adopted the winning entry by "Smurrayinchester", a 3×3 grid of wooden tiles, each bearing a character from a different writing system. However, the poll did not see as much participation from the Wiktionary community as some community members had hoped, and a number of the larger wikis ultimately kept their textual logos.

In April 2009, the issue was resurrected with a new contest. This time, a depiction by "AAEngelman" of an open hardbound dictionary won a head-to-head vote against the 2006 logo, but the process to refine and adopt the new logo then stalled. In the following years, some wikis replaced their textual logos with one of the two newer logos. In 2012, 55 wikis that had been using the English Wiktionary logo received localized versions of the 2006 design by "Smurrayinchester". In July 2016, the English Wiktionary adopted a variant of this logo. , 135 wikis, representing 61% of Wiktionary's entries, use a logo based on the 2006 design by "Smurrayinchester", 33 wikis (36%) use a textual logo, and three wikis (3%) use the 2009 design by "AAEngelman".

Criteria for ensuring accuracy 
To ensure accuracy, the English Wiktionary has a policy requiring that terms be attested. Terms in major languages such as English and Chinese must be verified by:

 clearly widespread use, or
 use in permanently recorded media, conveying meaning, in at least three independent instances spanning at least a year.

For less-documented languages such as Creek and extinct languages such as Latin, one use in a permanently recorded medium or one mention in a reference work is sufficient verification.

Multi-lingual 
The active sites have  articles, and the closed sites have  articles.

The top ten Wiktionary language projects by mainspace article count:

For a complete list with totals see Wikimedia Statistics:

Critical reception 

Critical reception of Wiktionary has been mixed. In 2006, Jill Lepore wrote in the article "Noah's Ark" for The New Yorker,

There's no show of hands at Wiktionary. There's not even an editorial staff. "Be your own lexicographer!", might be Wiktionary's motto. Who needs experts? Why pay good money for a dictionary written by lexicographers when we could cobble one together ourselves?

Wiktionary isn't so much republican or democratic as Maoist. And it's only as good as the copyright-expired books from which it pilfers.

Keir Graff's review for Booklist was less critical:

Is there a place for Wiktionary? Undoubtedly. The industry and enthusiasm of its many creators are proof that there's a market. And it's wonderful to have another strong source to use when searching the odd terms that pop up in today's fast-changing world and the online environment. But as with so many Web sources (including this column), it's best used by sophisticated users in conjunction with more reputable sources.

References in other publications are fleeting and part of larger discussions of Wikipedia, not progressing beyond a definition, although David Brooks in The Nashua Telegraph described it as "wild and woolly". One of the impediments to independent coverage of Wiktionary is the continuing confusion that it is merely an extension of Wikipedia.

The measure of correctness of the inflections for a subset of the Polish words in the English Wiktionary showed that this grammatical data is very stable. Only 131 out of 4,748 Polish words have had their inflection data corrected.

, Wiktionary has seen growing use in academia.

Wiktionary data in natural language processing
Wiktionary has semi-structured data. Wiktionary lexicographic data can be converted to machine-readable format in order to be used in natural language processing tasks.

Wiktionary's data mining is a complex task. There are the following difficulties:
(1) the constant and frequent changes to data and schemata
(2) the heterogeneity in Wiktionary language edition schemata and
(3) the human-centric nature of a wiki.

There are several parsers for different Wiktionary language editions:

 DBpedia Wiktionary : a subproject of DBpedia, the data are extracted from English, French, German, and Russian Wiktionaries; the data includes language, parts of speech, definitions, semantic relations and translations. The declarative description of the page schema, regular expressions and finite state transducer are used in order to extract information.
 JWKTL (Java Wiktionary Library) : provides access to English Wiktionary and German Wiktionary dumps via a Java Wiktionary API. The data includes language, parts of speech, definitions, quotations, semantic relations, etymologies and translations. JWKTL is distributed under the Apache License.
 wikokit : the parser of English Wiktionary and Russian Wiktionary. The parsed data includes language, parts of speech, definitions, quotations, semantic relations and translations. This is a multi-licensed open-source software.
 Etymological entries have been parsed in the Etymological WordNet project.

Examples of natural language processing tasks which have been solved with the help of Wiktionary data include:

 Rule-based machine translation between Dutch language and Afrikaans; data of English Wiktionary, Dutch Wiktionary and Wikipedia were used with the Apertium machine translation platform.
 Construction of machine-readable dictionary by the parser NULEX, which integrates open linguistic resources: English Wiktionary, WordNet, and VerbNet. The parser NULEX scrapes English Wiktionary for tense information (verbs), plural form and parts of speech (nouns).
 Speech recognition and synthesis, where Wiktionary was used to automatically create pronunciation dictionaries. Word-pronunciation pairs were retrieved from 6 Wiktionary language editions (Czech, English, French, Spanish, Polish, and German). Pronunciations are in terms of the International Phonetic Alphabet. The ASR system based on English Wiktionary has the highest word error rate, where each third phoneme has to be changed.
 Ontology engineering and semantic network constructing.
 Ontology matching.
 Text simplification. Medero & Ostendorf assessed vocabulary difficulty (reading level detection) with the help of Wiktionary data. Properties of words extracted from Wiktionary entries (definition length and POS, sense, and translation counts) were investigated. Medero & Ostendorf expected that
(1) very common words will be more likely to have multiple parts of speech,
(2) common words will be more likely to have multiple senses,
(3) common words will be more likely to have been translated into multiple languages. These features extracted from Wiktionary entries were useful in distinguishing word types that appear in Simple English Wikipedia articles from words that only appear in the Standard English comparable articles.
 Part-of-speech tagging. Li et al. (2012) built multilingual POS-taggers for eight resource-poor languages on the basis of English Wiktionary and hidden Markov models.
 Sentiment analysis.

"Wikidata:Lexicographical data" was started in 2018 to provide structured data support to Wiktionaries. It stores word data of all languages in a machine readable data model, under a dedicated "Lexeme" namespace in Wikidata. As of October 2021, the project has amassed over 600,000 lexeme entries of various languages.

See also
List of Wiktionaries
Lingua Libre

Notes

References

Citations

Sources

External links

 
 List of all Wiktionary editions
 
 
 Wiktionary's multilingual statistics
 Wikimedia's page on Wiktionary (including list of all existing Wiktionaries)
 Pages about Wiktionary in Meta.

Advertising-free websites
Etymological dictionaries
Internet properties established in 2002
MediaWiki websites
Multilingual websites
Online dictionaries
Wikimedia projects